WBBI (107.5 FM, "New Country B107.5") is a commercial radio station licensed to Endwell, New York, and serving the Greater Binghamton area. The station is owned by iHeartMedia and broadcasts a country music format. The station's studios are located in Vestal, and its transmitter is on Robinson Hill Road in Endicott.

History
WBBI signed on in 1998 as country-formatted "B107.5." On March 31, 2003, the station ended the country format. An April Fools' Day prank in 2003 rebranded the station as rhythmic CHR, "107.5 Kiss-FM". The following day,  WBBI announced it was time to say "Kiss off!" and flipped to classic rock, its new permanent format, branded as "Pure Classic Rock, 107.5 The Bear." The first play on the rechristened "The Bear" was "Won't Get Fooled Again" by The Who.

On September 15, 2010, WBBI changed its format from classic rock to classic hits, identified as "Big 107.5". On April 15, 2013, WBBI reverted to a country format, reviving the "B107.5" identity.

References

External links
New Country B107.5 website

BBI
Country radio stations in the United States
Radio stations established in 1998
1998 establishments in New York (state)
IHeartMedia radio stations